Ronan McKenna (born in Ireland) is a British-based television presenter familiar from the now defunct Quiz TV to current hosting duties on The Great Big British Quiz as of 9 June 2006.

References

 

British television presenters
Living people
Year of birth missing (living people)